The 1912 PCHA season was the first season of the now defunct men's professional ice hockey Pacific Coast Hockey Association (PCHA), a league founded on December 7, 1911. The three teams, all based in British Columbia, Canada, were to play a sixteen-game schedule, but one game was cancelled. The season ran from January 2 to March 19, 2012, ending with the New Westminster Royals as the first PCHA champions. In February, the PCHA had issued a challenge to the two-year-old National Hockey Association (NHA) to have the two leagues' champions play a series for the Stanley Cup, but the season ended too late for the Royals to travel east to face the NHA champion Quebec Bulldogs, who retained the Stanley Cup without further challenge for the 1911–12 season.

The season was not profitable. Frank Patrick, captain of the Vancouver Millionaires and director of the Vancouver Arena Company, was interviewed on March 6, 1912, by The Globe and expressed his hopes that the 1912–13 PCHA season, with an expected new team in Seattle, would provide better financial results. As it turned out, the PCHA did not expand beyond three teams until 1915–16, when the Seattle Metropolitans started operations.

Regular season

Most of the players for the league were recruited from the east. Many players joined the PCHA from the National Hockey Association (NHA), including Tom Dunderdale, Jimmy Gardner, Pud Glass, Newsy Lalonde, Bert Lindsay, Tommy Phillips and Skinner Poulin. Frank and Lester Patrick had actively targeted the NHA for players as British Columbia had a smaller base of players. In the previous season, the NHA had imposed maximums on player salaries and a salary cap per team that were extremely unpopular with players. Goaltender Hughie Lehman was signed from Berlin of the Ontario Professional Hockey League (OPHL).

The PCHA played seven-man rules with a rover, while the NHA experimented with six-man rules.

Final standings
Note: W = Wins, L = Losses, T = Ties, GF= Goals For, GA = Goals against

Schedule and results

† Played in Victoria

A game between Vancouver and New Westminster was cancelled at the end of the season.

Player statistics

Goaltending averages
Note: GP = games played, GA = goals against, SO = shutouts, GAA = Goals against average

Scoring leaders

See also
Pacific Coast Hockey Association
List of pre-NHL seasons
1912 in sports

References

Bibliography

Notes

PCHA
Pacific Coast Hockey Association seasons